Biohydrometallurgy is a technique in the world of metallurgy that utilizes biological agents (bacteria) to recover and treat metals such as copper. Modern biohydrometallurgy advances started with the bioleaching of copper more efficiently in the 1950's

Important Definitions 
Bio: Shortened form of Biology; refers to usage of bacteria. 
Hydro: Term referring to the usage of water; process occurs in aqueous environments
Metallurgy: A process involving the separating and refining of metals from other substances; 
Bioleaching: Using biological agents (bacteria) to extract metals or soils; general term used to encompass all forms biotechnological forms of extraction (hydrometallurgy, biohydrometallurgy, biomining, etc)

General Information 
 Interdisciplinary field involving processes that
 make use of microbes, usually bacteria and archaea 
 mainly take place in aqueous environment  
 deal with metal production and treatment of metal containing materials and solutions 
"Biohydrometallurgy may generally referred to as the branch of biotechnology dealing with the study and application of the economic potential of the interactions between microbes and minerals. It concerns, thus, all those engaged, directly or indirectly, in the exploitation of mineral resources and in environmental protection: geologists, economic geologists, mining engineers, metallurgists, hydrometallurgists, chemists and chemical engineers. In addition to these specialists, there are the microbiologists whose work is indispensable in the design, implementation and running of biohydrometallurgical processes."
Biohydrometallurgy was first used more than 300 years ago to recover copper. The uses have evolved to extracting gold, uranium, and other metals.

Hydrometallurgy 
Hydrometallurgy refers to a specific process involving the chemical properties of water to create an aqueous solution for metal extraction through a series of chemical reactions

Biohydrometallurgy as a Science 
Biohydrometallurgy represents the overlap of the world of microorganisms to the process of hydrometallurgy. The usage of microorganisms can be used for recovery and extraction of metals.

Applications 
Biohydrometallurgy is used to perform processes involving metals, for example, microbial mining, oil recovery, bioleaching, water-treatment and others. Biohydrometallurgy is mainly used to recover certain metals from sulfide ores. It is usually utilized when conventional mining procedures are too expensive or ineffective in recovering a metal such as copper, cobalt, gold, lead, nickel, uranium and zinc.

See also 
 Bacterial oxidation
 metallurgy     
 hydrometallurgy 
 biotechnology  
 Bacteria

References

External links 
 BioMineWiki –a wiki on biohydrometallurgy

Metallurgy
Biotechnology